Kārlis Ašmanis (6 December 1898 – 29 November 1962) was a Latvian footballer. He competed in the men's tournament at the 1924 Summer Olympics.

References

External links
 

1898 births
1962 deaths
Latvian footballers
Latvia international footballers
Olympic footballers of Latvia
Footballers at the 1924 Summer Olympics
Place of birth missing
Association football defenders